An independence referendum was held in Lithuania on 9 February 1991, eleven months after independence from the Soviet Union had been declared on 11 March 1990. Just over 93% of those voting voted in favour of independence, while the number of eligible voters voting "yes" was 76.5%, far exceeding the threshold of 50%. Independence was subsequently achieved in August 1991. The independence of the Republic of Lithuania was re-recognized by the United States on 2 September 1991 and by the Soviet Union on 6 September 1991.

Results

See also
1991 Latvian independence and democracy referendum
1991 Estonian independence referendum
1991 Soviet Union referendum

References

Singing Revolution
Lithuania
Independence
1991 in the Soviet Union
Referendums in Lithuania
Referendums in the Soviet Union
Lithuania
Dissolution of the Soviet Union
February 1991 events in Europe